The men's decathlon event at the 1999 Summer Universiade was held 6–7 July at the Estadio Son Moix in Palma de Mallorca, Spain.

Results

References

Results (archived)

Athletics at the 1999 Summer Universiade
1999